
Gmina Suchożebry is a rural gmina (administrative district) in Siedlce County, Masovian Voivodeship, in east-central Poland.

Villages
Gmina Suchożebry contains the villages and settlements of Borki Siedleckie, Brzozów, Kopcie, Kownaciska, Krynica, Krześlin, Krześlinek, Nakory, Podnieśno, Przygody, Sosna-Kicki, Sosna-Korabie, Sosna-Kozółki, Sosna-Trojanki, Stany Duże, Stany Małe, Suchożebry and Wola Suchożebrska.

Neighbouring gminas
Gmina Suchożebry is bordered by the gminas of Bielany, Mokobody, Mordy, Paprotnia and Siedlce.

References

Polish official population figures 2006

Suchozebry
Siedlce County